Planters Building, also known as the First Union Bank Building, is a historic office building located at Lumberton, Robeson County, North Carolina.  It was designed by the firm of Wilson, Berryman & Kennedy and built in 1925–1926. It is a five-story, Classical Revival style steel frame building sheathed in brick and rusticated cast concrete.  The ground levels feature round arched windows and the main entrance is reached through a barrel-arched, coffered vault. Attached to the corner of the building is an original rectangular iron-cased clock.

It was added to the National Register of Historic Places in 1987. It is located in the Lumberton Commercial Historic District on the southeast corner of Chestnut and 4th Streets.

References

Office buildings on the National Register of Historic Places in North Carolina
Neoclassical architecture in North Carolina
Office buildings completed in 1926
Buildings and structures in Robeson County, North Carolina
National Register of Historic Places in Robeson County, North Carolina
Individually listed contributing properties to historic districts on the National Register in North Carolina